Events from the year 1970 in Taiwan, Republic of China. This year is numbered Minguo 59 according to the official Republic of China calendar.

Incumbents
 President – Chiang Kai-shek
 Vice President – Yen Chia-kan
 Premier – Yen Chia-kan
 Vice Premier – Chiang Ching-kuo

Events

February
 1 February – The establishment of Institute of Economics of the Academia Sinica.
 8 February – The  begins.

July
 1 July – The establishment of Taiwan External Trade Development Council.

Births
 4 February – Sean Lien, candidate of Mayor of Taipei City for the 2014 municipal election
 23 April – Wu Yi-chen, member of Legislative Yuan (2012-2016)
 28 May – Chang Hsiu-ching, singer
 29 June – Chang Ting, actress
 30 June – Chen Jiunn-ming, football player and manager
 5 September – Wu Pao-chun, baker
 17 September – Isabelle Cheng, spy
 24 October – Ying Wei-min, actor and singer
 27 October – Tarcy Su, singer and actress

Deaths
 23 March – Kao Ping-tse, 82, astronomer.

References

 
Years of the 20th century in Taiwan